The 1994 Irish Masters was the twentieth edition of the professional invitational snooker tournament, which took place from 22 to 27 March 1994.
The tournament was played at Goffs in Kill, County Kildare, and featured twelve professional players.

Steve Davis won the title for the eighth time, beating Alan McManus 9–8 in the final.

Qualifying

Four qualifying matches were played, under a best-of-nine frames format, the winners going on to play Jimmy White, John Parrott, Steve Davis and Stephen Hendry, all of whom were seeded to the quarter-final stage.

Round 1

 Ronnie O'Sullivan 5–1  Terry Griffiths
 Fergal O'Brien 5–1  Willie Thorne
 James Wattana 5–1  Peter Ebdon
 Alan McManus 5–2  Ken Doherty

Main draw

Final

Century breaks

141, 102  Fergal O'Brien
141  Stephen Hendry
120, 105, 101  Steve Davis
118  John Parrott
118, 106  Alan McManus

References

Irish Masters
Irish Masters
Irish Masters
Irish Masters